Putnam Magazine is a regional lifestyle magazine that covers Putnam County, New York, and it is published by the local (Rockland, Westchester, Putnam) newspaper, The Journal News, a division of Gannett. The publication was launched in 2005 and publishes on a quarterly basis. Mary Lynn Mitcham was the editor-in-chief until 2011.

Past issues
 Fall/Winter 2005
 March/April 2006

References

External links
 Putnam Magazine website

Gannett publications
Lifestyle magazines published in the United States
Magazines established in 2005
Magazines published in New York (state)
Putnam County, New York
Quarterly magazines published in the United States